Form of life is a term used sparingly by Ludwig Wittgenstein in posthumously published works Philosophical Investigations, On Certainty and in parts of his Nachlass. Wittgenstein in his Tractatus Logico-Philosophicus (TLP) was concerned with the structure of language, responding to Frege and Russell. Later, Wittgenstein found the need to revise the view held in TLP as he did not resolve issues concerning elementary propositions. Leading up to a revised view in his PI, still concerned with language, but now focusing on how it is used and not insisting that it has an inherent structure or set of rules. Deriving from this that language comes about as a result of human activity.

Italian philosopher Giorgio Agamben takes Wittgenstein's concepts and applies them to the history of Western monasticism in order to rethink the consequences of these concepts for doing (contemporary) politics. In The Highest Poverty – Monastic Rules and Form-of-Life, Agamben finds earlier versions of form-of-life in monastic rules, developing from 'vita vel regula', 'regula et vita', 'forma vivendi', and 'forma vitae'. Agamben looks at the emerging genre of written rules starting in the 9th century, and its development into both law and something beyond law in the Franciscan form-of-life, in which the Franciscans replaced the idea that we possess our life (or objects generally) with the concept of 'usus', that is 'use'.

References

Further reading 
Giorgio Agamben. The Highest Poverty: Monastic Rules and Form-of-Life. Translated by Adam Kotsko. Stanford University Press 2013.
Rahel Jaeggi, Critique of Forms of Life. Cambridge, Mass. / London 2019
David Kishik, Wittgenstein's Form of Life. London: Continuum, 2008. 
Jesús Padilla Gálvez; Margit Gaffal, Forms of Life and Language Games. Heusenstamm, Ontos Verlag, 2011.   
Jesús Padilla Gálvez, Margit Gaffal (Eds.): Doubtful Certainties. Language-Games, Forms of Life, Relativism. Ontos Verlag, Frankfurt a. M., Paris, Lancaster, New Brunswick 2012, .
Ludwig Wittgenstein. Philosophical Investigations: The German Text, with a Revised English Translation 50th Anniversary Commemorative Edition. Trns, G.E.M. Anscombe. Wiley-Blackwell; 3rd edition, 202. 

Philosophy of science
Continental philosophy
Ludwig Wittgenstein
Philosophy of life